The Crystal World is an album from drone rock band Locrian. It was released on November 27, 2010 through Utech Records.

Background

Locrian announced the release of The Crystal World on September 8, 2010. The press release for the album describes the album as the groups first with percussionist Steven Hess and “finds the group manipulating tones and textures that transport the listener to an apocalyptic wasteland.”  The album was titled after JG Ballard’s novel, The Crystal World, and the lyrics were inspired by this book as well.

Track listing

Personnel
Credits adapted from All Music.

André Foisy – guitar 
Terence Hannum – synthesizers, vocals
Steven Hess – drums
 Erica Burgner - vocals
 Gretchen Koehler - violin

Production
 Dave Whitcomb - engineer
 Justin Bartlett / VBERKVLT - artwork
James Plotkin - mastering

References

External links 
 

2010 albums
Locrian (band) albums